The Parable of the Prodigal Son (also known as the parable of the Two Brothers, Lost Son, Loving Father, or of the Forgiving Father) is one of the parables of Jesus Christ in the Bible, appearing in Luke 15:11–32. The setting in vv. 1-3 has Jesus tell three stories to a group of Pharisees and scribes who were complaining that he welcomes and eats with sinners: (1) a man throws a party after finding the one lost sheep among his one hundred sheep (vv. 4-7); (2) a woman throws a party after finding the one lost coin among her ten coins (vv. 8-10); (3) a man throws a party after finding the one lost son among his two sons. The first two stories are said to typify the celestial party when sinners repent. This progressive set of narratives climaxes with the third story, which best reflects the setting. The refusal of the older son to join the party directly relates to the refusal of Jesus' hearers to join him in partying with the sinners who had come to him. Likewise, the incomplete third story--we don't know if the older son ever joined the party--parallels the situation of Jesus' listeners--do they ever come to accept sinners as he does? More importantly, do they ever come to accept heaven's joy at the repentance of sinners?

In Revised Common Lectionary and Roman Rite Catholic Lectionary, this parable is read on the fourth Sunday of Lent (in Year C); in the latter it is also included in the long form of the Gospel on the 24th Sunday of Ordinary Time in Year C, along with the preceding two parables of the cycle. In the Eastern Orthodox Church it is read on the Sunday of the Prodigal Son.

Narrative

The parable begins with a man who had two sons, and the younger of them asks his father to give him his share of the estate. The implication is the son could not wait for his father's death for his inheritance, he wanted it immediately. The father agrees and divides his estate between both sons.

Upon receiving his portion of the inheritance, the younger son travels to a distant country, where he indulges in extravagant living. It's implied that he drinks, gambles, and sleeps with prostitutes, during this time. However, it isn't long before he has exhausted all his money, and immediately thereafter, a permanent famine strikes the land. This leaves him desperately poor. And his possessions (which he bought with his money) were sold to pay his debts. He is forced to take work as a swineherd (which would have been abhorrent to Jesus' Jewish audience, who considered swine unclean animals) where he reaches the point of envying the food of the pigs he is tending to. At this time, he finally comes to his senses:.

 This implies the father was watching hopefully for the son's return.

The son starts his rehearsed speech, admitting his sins, and declaring himself unworthy of being his father's son, but in most versions of Luke, the son does not even finish, before his father accepts him back wholeheartedly without hesitation as the father calls for his servants to dress the son in the finest robe available, get a ring for his finger, and sandals for his feet, and to slaughter the "fatted calf" for a celebratory meal (dinner party).

The older son, who was at work in the fields, hears the sound of celebration, and is told by a fellow servant about the return of his younger brother. He is not impressed, and becomes angry. He also has a speech for his father:

The parable concludes with the father explaining that while the older son has always been present, and everything the father owns also belongs to the older son, because the younger son had returned, in a sense, from the dead, celebration was necessary:

Interpretation

The opening, "A man had two sons" is a storyteller's trope and would immediately bring to mind Cain and Abel, Ishmael and Isaac, and Jacob and Esau. Jesus then confounds the listeners' expectations when the younger son is shown to be foolish.

While a number of commentators see the request of the younger son for his share of the inheritance as "brash, even insolent" and "tantamount to wishing that the father was dead," Jewish legal scholar Bernard Jackson says "Jewish sources give no support to [the idea] that the prodigal, in seeking the advance, wishes his father dead."

The young man's actions do not lead to success; he squanders his inheritance and he eventually becomes an indentured servant, with the degrading job of looking after pigs, and even envying them for the carob pods they eat. This recalls Proverbs 29:3: "Whoever loves wisdom gives joy to his father, but whoever consorts with harlots squanders his wealth."

Upon his return, his father treats the young man with a generosity far more than he has a right to expect. He is given the best robe, a ring for his finger, and sandals for his feet. Jewish philosopher Philo observes: Parents often do not lose thought for their wastrel (asoton) children.… In the same way, God too…takes thought also for those who live a misspent life, thereby giving them time for reformation, and also keeping within the bounds His own merciful nature.

The Pesikta Rabbati has a similar story:A king had a son who had gone astray from his father on a journey of a hundred days. His friends said to him, 'Return to your father.' He said, 'I cannot.' Then his father sent word, 'Return as far as you can, and I will come the rest of the way to you.' So God says, 'Return to me, and I will return to you.'

The older son, in contrast, seems to think in terms of "law, merit, and reward," rather than "love and graciousness." He may represent the Pharisees who were criticizing Jesus.

Leviticus Rabbah 13:4 also contains a short saying that matches the character of the parable:R. Aha has said: When a Jew has to resort to carobs, he repents.

The last few verses of the parable summarize the tale in accordance with the Jewish teaching of the two ways of acting: the way of life (obedience) and the way of death (sin). God, according to Judaism, rejoices over and grants more graces to repentant sinners than righteous souls who don't need repentance.

Following the Parable of the Lost Sheep and the Parable of the Lost Coin, this is the last of three parables about loss and redemption that Jesus tells after the Pharisees and religious leaders accuse him of welcoming and eating with "sinners." The father's joy described in the parable reflects divine love: the "boundless mercy of God," and "God's refusal to limit the measure of his grace."

Catholic
Justus Knecht, like others, breaks this parable into three parts noting that, "The father in the parable signifies God; the elder son. the just; and the younger son, the sinner." In the first part:
"Man begins to fall away from God by allowing unlawful desires to take possession of his heart. In consequence, he will soon come to regard God's commandments as so many fetters, and to long for greater licence. He loses all taste for prayer and the word of God, and imagines that he would be a happier man if he could live according to his passions. Having thus separated himself inwardly from God, an outward separation speedily follows. He renounces the friendship of good men, neglects the services of the Church and the frequenting of the Sacraments, follows his own way, and shamelessly transgresses God’s commandments. He then goes into a strange and distant land, namely further and further from God: The "far country”, says St. Augustine, "signifies the forgetfulness of God”. Almighty God lets the sinner go his own way, for He has given to man free-will, and does not want a forced obedience, but an obedience springing from love." 

Roger Baxter in his Meditations describes the second part:
As soon as this young prodigal had left his father's house he fell into misfortunes. " He began to be in want." Thus sinners who estrange themselves from the sacraments, from exhortation, and the company of the virtuous, soon begin to be in want of spiritual subsistence. " He joined himself to one of the citizens of that country," as a servant. Every sinner is a slave to the Devil; and as the citizen employed the prodigal youth in feeding swine, so the Devil employs his followers in gratifying their own sensual appetites, which brutalize human nature. The prodigal attempted to satisfy his hunger, by feeding on the husks of swine, but he did not succeed: neither can the sinner succeed in filling the capacity of his immortal soul by earthly gratifications.

Commemoration and use

Orthodox
The Eastern Orthodox Church traditionally reads this story on the Sunday of the Prodigal Son, which in their liturgical year is the Sunday before Meatfare Sunday and about two weeks before the beginning of Great Lent. One common kontakion hymn of the occasion reads:

I have recklessly forgotten Your glory, O Father;
And among sinners I have scattered the riches which You gave to me.
And now I cry to You as the Prodigal:I have sinned before You, O merciful Father;
Receive me as a penitent and make me as one of Your hired servants.

Catholic
In his 1984 apostolic exhortation titled, in Latin, "Reconciliatio et paenitentia" ('Reconciliation and Penance'), Pope John Paul II used this parable to explain the process of conversion and reconciliation. Emphasizing that God the Father is "rich in mercy" and always ready to forgive, he stated that reconciliation is a gift on his part. He stated that for the Church her "mission of reconciliation is the initiative, full of compassionate love and mercy, of that God who is love." He also explored the issues raised by this parable in his second encyclical, "Dives in misericordia" ('Rich in Mercy'), issued in 1980.

In the arts

Art
Of the thirty-or-so parables in the canonical Gospels, this parable was one of four that were shown in medieval art—along with that of the Wise and Foolish Virgins, the Dives and Lazarus, and the Good Samaritan—almost to the exclusion of the others, though not mixed in with the narrative scenes of the Life of Christ. (The Labourers in the Vineyard also appears in Early Medieval works.)

From the Renaissance, the numbers shown widened slightly, and the various scenes of the Prodigal Son—the high living, herding the pigs, and the return—became the clear favourite. Albrecht Dürer made a famous engraving, the Prodigal Son amongst the Pigs (1496), a popular subject in the Northern Renaissance. Rembrandt depicted several scenes from the parable, especially the final episode, which he etched, drew, or painted on several occasions during his career. At least one of his works—i.e., The Prodigal Son in the Tavern, a portrait of himself as the Son revelling with his wife—is, like many artists' depictions, a way of dignifying a genre tavern scene (if the title was indeed the original intention of the artist). His late Return of the Prodigal Son (1662–1669) is one of his most popular works.

The Prodigal Son is a sculpture in Harrisburg, Pennsylvania, by George Grey Barnard that depicts the loving reunion of the father and son from the "Parable of the Prodigal Son."

Stage
In the 15th and 16th centuries, the theme was a sufficiently popular subject that the 'Prodigal Son play' can be seen as a subgenre of the English morality play. Examples include The Rare Triumphs of Love and Fortune, The Disobedient Child, and Acolastus.

Notable adaptations for performance include

Many of these adaptations added to the original Biblical material to lengthen the story. For example, The Prodigal (1955) film took considerable liberties, such as adding a temptress priestess of Astarte to the tale.

Music

an 1680 Filius prodigus, H.399 & H.399 a, oratorio by Marc-Antoine Charpentier
an 1869 oratorio by Arthur Sullivan;
 an 1880 opera by Amilcare Ponchielli;
 a 1884 cantata by Claude Debussy;
 a 1929 ballet choreographed by George Balanchine to music by Sergei Prokofiev;
 a 1957 ballet by Hugo Alfvén; and
 a 1968 opera by Benjamin Britten.

Popular music
The parable is referenced in the last verse of the traditional Irish folk tune "The Wild Rover":

"Jump Around" by the Los Angeles rap group House of Pain (1992) includes a verse by member Everlast, who references the parable as well as the Bible itself:

Other references and semi-adaptations include

 "Prodigal Son" by Reverend Robert Wilkins, which tells the story of the parable, is probably better known by the Rolling Stones cover version, which is featured on Beggars Banquet (1968).
 "Prodigal Man", written by Ted Nugent, was performed by The Amboy Dukes as the second track of their third album Migration (1969)
 "Let Me In" by The Osmonds presents a version of the parable as part of their Mormon concept album The Plan (1973), and was a hit song in its time.
 "Prodigal Son" by Steel Pulse, featured on the British Reggae band's debut album Handsworth Revolution (1979), recreates the Biblical story as a Rastafarian parable.
 "Prodigal Son" by British heavy-metal band Iron Maiden appears on their second album Killers (1981). 
 "The First Time" by U2, featured on Zooropa (1993), is based on the parable but suggests an alternate ending to the story. 
 "Make Me A Servant" by Kelly Willard (1982) could be argued as being based on what the son says to his father when he returns home.
 "The Prodigal Son Suite" by Keith Green is featured on his The Prodigal Son (1983) album and is one of the first posthumous releases by the late piano player and gospel singer. 
 "When God Ran" by Benny Hester (1985), which is based on the parable, is another such song from the '80s Christian music scene.
 "Who Cares?" by Extreme was influenced by the parable and appears on the album III Sides to Every Story (1992).
 "Prodigal Son" by Kid Rock appears on his second album The Polyfuze Method (1993). The Detroit musician later re-recorded the track for his History of Rock (2000) compilation album.
 "She Walked Away" by BarlowGirl was influenced by the parable and is featured on the Christian rock trio's 2004 self-titled album. 
 "One" a progressive rock concept album released by Neal Morse in 2004 is based on the prodigal son story.
 "The Prodigal Son" by the "Indie" rock band, Two Gallants, as part of their What the Toll Tells (2006) album. 
 "The Prodigal Son's Prayer" by country artist Dierks Bentley, featured on the album Long Trip Alone (2006), is based on the son's perspective of coming home after he's ruined himself in the world.
 "Please Come Home" by Dustin Kensrue is the titular song of the album of the same name released in 2007. 
 "Prodigal Son" by Bad Religion is featured on New Maps of Hell (2007).
 "Prodigal Son" by rock band Sevendust is featured on Chapter VII: Hope and Sorrow (2008).
 "Modern Day Prodigal Son" by Brantley Gilbert is featured on the album of the same name from 2009. 
 "Prodigal Son" by Gideon appears on the post-hardcore band's second album Milestone (2012).
 The parable is used as inspiration for several songs in The Oh Hellos' album 'Through the Deep Dark Valley'.
 "Prodigal Son" by Jamie's Elsewhere, a post-hardcore band.
 "Left Hand Free" by English indie rock band alt-J (2014) references the parable in the first verse.
 "Prodigal" by Sidewalk Prophets is included in the Christian band's Something Different (2015) album. The song is uplifting, with lyrics that are directed towards the titular Son from the parable, or any person who is or has felt like they are in a similar situation.
 "When the Prodigal Comes Home" by gospel artists Tribute Quartet (2016).
 "Fire in Bone" is a retelling of the parable by the rock band the Killers, featured on their album Imploding the Mirage (2020).
"Prodigal" by Texas southern rock band Blacktop Mojo on their album "Burn The Ships" (2017).

Literature

Another literary tribute to this parable is Dutch theologian Henri Nouwen's 1992 book, The Return of the Prodigal Son: A Story of Homecoming, in which he describes his own spiritual journey infused with understanding, based on an encounter with Rembrandt's painting that depicts the son's return. The book deals with three personages: the younger, prodigal son; the self-righteous, resentful older son; and the compassionate father—all of whom the author identifies with personally. An earlier work with similarities to the parable is "Le retour de l'enfant prodigue" ('The Return of the Prodigal Son'), a short story by André Gide.

Rudyard Kipling wrote a poem giving an interpretation of the younger brother's perspective. The poem appears as the heading to the fifth chapter, titled "The Prodigal Son", of his 1901 novel Kim.

The Parable is a recurring theme in the works of Rainer Maria Rilke, who interpreted it in a different way to the conventional reading. Rilke's version is not so concerned with redemption and the forgiveness of family: the love of the family, and human love in general, was seen as less worthy than unreciprocated love, which is the purest form of love. In loving the family less, the Son can love God more, even if this love is not returned.

The theme of the Prodigal Son plays a major role in Anne Tyler's novel A Spool of Blue Thread.

The parable is also referred to in two comedies by William Shakespeare, specifically The Merchant Of Venice and As You Like It, as well as in Shakespeare's romance, The Winter's Tale.

In one of his clemency petitions to the Bombay Presidency in 1913, the Indian independence activist Vinayak Damodar Savarkar described himself as a "prodigal son" longing to return to the "parental doors of the government".

Similar parable in Mahayana Buddhism
A parable of a lost son can also be found in the Mahayana Buddhist Lotus Sutra. The two parables are so similar in their outline and many details that several scholars have assumed that one version has influenced the other or that both texts share a common origin. However, an influence of the biblical story on the Lotus sutra is regarded as unlikely given the early dating of the stratum of the sutra containing the Buddhist parable.

Despite their similarities, both parables continue differently after the father and son meet for the first time at the son's return. In the biblical story, there is an immediate reunion of the two. In contrast, in the Lotus sutra, the poor son does not recognize the rich man as his father. When the father sends out some attendants to welcome the son, the son panics, fearing some kind of retribution. The father then lets the son leave without telling him of their kinship. However, he gradually draws the son closer to him by employing him in successively higher positions, only to tell him of their kinship in the end. In the Buddhist parable, the father symbolises the Buddha, and the son symbolises any human being. Their kinship symbolises that any being has Buddha nature. The concealment of the kinship of the father to his son is regarded as a skillful means (Sanskrit: upāya).

See also
 Ministry of Jesus
 Parable of the Workers in the Vineyard regarding the theme of God's unmerited grace, as distinguished from the idea of "earning" God's favour.

References

Verses

Citations

Further reading
Brooks, David. 17 February 2014. "The Prodigal Sons." The New York Times.
Cantalamessa, Raniero. 17 March 2007. "Comments on Fourth Sunday of Lent Readings." Zenit News Agency.
Dimopoulos, George. 24 February 2008. "The Prodigal Son." Orthodoxy and the World.
 Holgate, David A. 1999. Prodigality, liberality and meanness in the parable of the prodigal son: a Greco-Roman perspective on Luke 15.11-32. Continuum. .
Horbury, Ezra. 2019. Prodigality in Early Modern Drama. Boydell & Brewer. 
Morgan, G. Campbell. The Parable of the Father's Heart.
Keller, Timothy. 2011. The Prodigal God: Recovering the Heart of the Christian Faith. .

 Di Rocco, E., ed. 2013. "." Studium 4(109).
 — 2013. "." Studium 4(109).
 — 2014. "." Studium 2(110).
 — 2014. "Heimkehr: wohin?, Auszug: wohin?: ." Studium 2(110).

External links

Eastern Orthodox liturgical days
Gospel of Luke
Parables of Jesus
Animals in the Bible
Pigs in literature